Bang Seong-joon is a South Korean voice actor who joined the Munhwa Broadcasting Corporation's Voice Acting Division in 2002.

Roles

Broadcast TV
Futari wa Pretty Cure (Korea TV Edition, SBS)
Ojamajo Doremi (Korea TV Edition, MBC)
Hoshin Engi (Korea TV Edition, Tooniverse)
Doraemon (Korea TV Edition, MBC)
Rodosdo (Korea TV Edition, Tooniverse)
Jimmy Neutron (Korea TV Edition, MBC)
The Amazing World of Gumball (Korea TV edition, Cartoon Network) - Richard Watterson
The Amazing Adrenalini Brothers (Korea TV Edition, Cartoon Network)
Hwang Bi Hong (Korea TV Edition, MBC)

See also
Munhwa Broadcasting Corporation
MBC Voice Acting Division

Homepage
MBC Voice Acting Division Bang Seong-joon Blog 
AD Sound Bang Seong-joon Blog 

Living people
South Korean male voice actors
1973 births